Thomas Dunstan (20 April 1873 – 19 June 1954) was a member of the Queensland Legislative Assembly.

Early life
Dunstan was born at Thames, New Zealand, the son of Nicholas John Dunstan and his wife Esther Mary Ann (née Connon). His brothers were George and William Dunstan. He was educated at Thames State School and the One Mile State School in Gympie. On leaving School he was an apprentice with The Gympie Times newspaper before joining the Gympie Truth as a reporter, secretary, and canvasser. In 1901, he was promoted to editor-manager of the Truth and held this position for the next 41 years  and in 1943 was the editor of the Labor Leader.

On 27 February 1901 he married Mary Lydement (died 1952) and together they had five sons and two daughters. Dunstan died at Gympie in June 1954 and was accorded a state funeral which proceeded from St Peter's Church of England in Gympie to the Gympie Cemetery.

Public life
Dunstan, a member of the Labor Party, won the seat of Gympie in 1915, defeating the Ministerial candidate and sitting member, George Mackay. Mackay later went on to have a successful career in the federal parliament. Dunstan held the seat until 1929 when he was defeated by Vivian Tozer of the CPNP.

He contested Gympie at the 1932 state elections once again losing to Tozer. In 1935 however, Dunstan won back the seat and went on to represent it until it was abolished in 1950. He then contested and won the new electorate of Nash, and holding it until he retired from politics three years later at 80 years of age.
 
During his parliamentary career he held the following roles:
 Temporary Chairman of Committees  1920–1924
 Temporary Chairman of Committees  1939–1949
 Secretary for Public Lands 1925–1929
 Minister without Office 1925–1925

References

Members of the Queensland Legislative Assembly
1873 births
Australian Labor Party members of the Parliament of Queensland
1954 deaths
People from Thames, New Zealand
People from Gympie
New Zealand emigrants to Australia